Leptosteges decetialis is a moth in the family Crambidae. It was described by Herbert Druce in 1896. It is found in Tabasco, Mexico.

References

Moths described in 1896
Schoenobiinae
Moths of Central America
Natural history of Tabasco